Đào Nhật Minh (born 27 April 1992) is a Vietnamese footballer who plays as a midfielder for V-League (Vietnam) club Hồng Lĩnh Hà Tĩnh.

References 

1992 births
Living people
Vietnamese footballers
Association football midfielders
V.League 1 players
Than Quang Ninh FC players
People from Quảng Ninh province
Footballers at the 2014 Asian Games
Asian Games competitors for Vietnam